The Company Band is the debut studio album by American rock band The Company Band.

Track listing

Personnel
 Neil Fallon – lead vocals
 James Rota – lead guitar, backing vocals
 Jess Margera – drums
 Dave Bone – guitar
 Brad Davis – bass

References

2009 albums
The Company Band albums